Miguel Zenón (born December 30, 1976) is a Puerto Rican alto saxophonist, composer, band leader, music producer, and educator. He is a multiple Grammy Award nominee, and the recipient of a Guggenheim Fellowship and a MacArthur Fellowship. He also holds an Honorary Doctorate Degree in the Arts from Universidad del Sagrado Corazón. Zenón has released many albums as a band leader and appeared on over 100 recordings as a sideman.

Early life
Born in San Juan, Puerto Rico, Zenón was raised in Residencial Luis Llorens Torres, the largest housing project in the Island. Although he didn't grow up in a family of musicians, he was nevertheless exposed to various styles of music from a very early age. At age 10 he received his first lessons on music theory and solfeggio from Ernesto Vigoreaux, an elderly gentleman who traveled from the adjacent neighborhood of Villa Palmeras to Llorens Torres every day in order to work with disadvantaged youth in the community. Zenón would eventually be admitted to Escuela Libre de Música, a performing arts middle school and high school where he was trained for six years on classical saxophone by Angel Marrero. On the 11th grade he was exposed to jazz music by some of his friends at the school and became very interested in the concept of improvisation and on the music of jazz saxophonist Charlie Parker. Although he had always shown interest in the natural sciences, he declined an engineering scholarship from the Recinto Universitario de Mayagüez (the foremost engineering institution in the Island) and decided to pursue a career in music. After a year and a half worth of efforts to gather enough funds in scholarships and financial aid, Zenón moved to Boston in the spring of 1996 to begin his studies at Berklee College of Music.

Education and session work 
At Berklee, Zenón's classmates included Antonio Sánchez, Anat Cohen, Avishai Cohen, Jaleel Shaw, and Jeremy Pelt. During his time in Boston, he was heavily influenced by Bill Pierce, Ed Tomassi, and Hal Crook. It was also during this time that he met Panamanian pianist Danilo Pérez, who would become a mentor and collaborator. After graduating from Berklee in 1996, Zenón attended Manhattan School of Music, where he studied with Dick Oatts, Nils Vigeland and Ludmila Ulehla and received a master's degree in Performance in 2001 before settling in New York City. As a sideman, he has worked with SFJAZZ Collective, Charlie Haden, Fred Hersch, Kenny Werner, Guillermo Klein & Los Guachos, David Sánchez, Danilo Pérez, The Vanguard Jazz Orchestra, Kurt Elling, The Mingus Big Band, Ray Barreto, Jerry González & The Fort Apache Band, Jeff Ballard Trio, Miles Okazaki, Dan Weiss, Dan Tepfer, Bobby Hutcherson, Steve Coleman, Andy Montañez, Brian Lynch, Antonio Sánchez, Joey Calderazzo and Paoli Mejías.

As leader

The Miguel Zenón Quartet 
In 1999 Zenón started getting together with Mexican drummer Antonio Sánchez (who he met at Berklee College of Music), Austrian bassist Hans Glawischnig (Zenón's bandmate in the David Sanchez Group) and Venezuelan pianist Luis Perdomo (a classmate of Glawischnig's at The Manhattan School of Music). They would meet for informal rehearsal sessions at Glawischnig's apartment in New York's Upper West Side and play through some of Zenón's early compositions. The group, which would eventually become the Miguel Zenón Quartet, soon started performing at various venues in the city, such as the C Note and The Jazz Gallery. In 2005 Sanchez began working regularly with The Pat Metheny Group, and was replaced in the Quartet by Puerto Rican drummer Henry Cole, for what has become the longest running version of the ensemble.

Recordings as leader 

 Looking Forward (Fresh Sound New Talent, 2002): Recommended by some of his peers, Miguel Zenón reached a deal with the Spanish record label Fresh Sound New Talent, which released his first album as a leader. The recording featured his working Quartet (with Perdomo, Glawischnig and Sanchez) and included many special guests, such as saxophonist David Sanchez, guitarist Ben Monder and percussionist Pernell Saturnino. The album was selected by the New York Times as the top "Alternative" jazz recording of 2002.
 Ceremonial (Marsalis Music, 2004): After Zenón's first release, he was approached by saxophonist Branford Marsalis (whom Zenón had met while working with David Sanchez) to join his newly formed record label Marsalis Music. Zenón was signed to a multi-record deal and released his second album as a leader with the label. The album featured the Quartet performing his original compositions plus an arrangement of the Gospel Hymn "Great is Thy Faithfulness". Ceremonial was described by All About Jazz as a "recording (that) brings not only Latin persuasions but also a refined mix of contemporary, classic, and global influences… Highly recommended".
 Jíbaro (Marsalis Music, 2005): His third recording as a leader featured original compositions inspired by elements coming from la La Música Jibara, a style of folk music from the rural areas of Puerto Rico. About Jíbaro, Jazz Times Magazine wrote: "A searing modern-jazz sound, a quartet sensibility that Zenon and his mates have spent years developing. The result is profound yet joyful, as rhythmically precise as it is lyrical and limber."
 Awake (Marsalis Music, 2008): Zenón's fourth release, and the first to incorporate Henry Cole on the drum chair, incorporates a string quartet and additional horns to Zenón's core group for and outing of original compositions.
 Esta Plena (Marsalis Music, 2009): His fifth album was inspired by Plena music from Puerto Rico, with original compositions supported by a fellowship from the John Simon Guggenheim Foundation. On it Zenón augmented his quartet to include three percussionist/vocalists and took on the additional roles of both lyricist and vocalist. Esta Plena received two Grammy nominations (Best Improvised Solo and Best Latin Jazz Album) and a Latin Grammy nomination for Best Latin Jazz Album.
 Alma Adentro (Marsalis Music, 2011): A tribute to the Puerto Rican Songbook on which Zenón arranged the music of five Puerto Rican composers: Bobby Capo, Tite Curet Alonso, Pedro Flores, Rafael Hernandez and Sylvia Rexach. The recording features his Quartet plus a ten-piece woodwind ensemble orchestrated and conducted by Guillermo Klein. Alma Adentro was chosen as the Best Jazz Recording of 2011 by iTunes and NPR, and received a Grammy nomination for Best Large Jazz Ensemble Album plus a Latin Grammy nomination for Best Instrumental Album.
 Rayuela (Sunnyside Records, 2012): A collaboration with French pianist/composer Laurent Coq, this album was inspired on the book of the same name by Argentinean writer Julio Cortazar. The recording also features Dana Leong (on cello and trombone) and Dan Weiss (on tabla, drums and percussion).
 Oye!!! Live in Puerto Rico (Miel Music, 2013): Zenón's eight recording as a leader (and first for his independent label Miel Music) features the debut recording of The Rhythm Collective, an ensemble first put together in 2003 for a month long tour of West Africa. The "all Puerto Rican" group includes Aldemar Valentín on electric bass, Tony Escapa on drums and Reinaldo de Jesus on percussion.
 Identities Are Changeable (Miel Music, 2014): Inspired by the idea of national identity as experienced by the Puerto Rican community in the United States, specifically in the New York City area. The music on the album was written around a series of interviews with several individuals, all of them New Yorkers of Puerto Rican descent. The album, which is also complemented by a video installment by David Dempewolf, features his Quartet plus a twelve-piece Big Band. Identities Are Changeable received a Grammy nomination for Best Latin Jazz Album.
 Típico (Miel Music, 2017): Celebrates the Miguel Zenón Quartet, his working band of more than 15 years. The album features original music by Zenón, which was specifically written for the members of the Quartet and directly inspired by their individual playing and personalities. Típico received a Grammy nomination and a Latin Grammy nomination for Best Latin Jazz Album.
 Yo Soy La Tradición (Miel Music, 2018): Original compositions by Zenón, inspired by various cultural and musical traditions from Puerto Rico. The music is scored for Alto Saxophone and String Quartet and features Spektral Quartet, a string ensemble based in Chicago, IL. Yo Soy La Tradición received a Grammy nomination and a Latin Grammy nomination for Best Latin Jazz Album.
 Sonero: The Music of Ismael Rivera (Miel Music, 2019): A tribute to the legendary Puerto Rican Salsa icon Ismael Rivera, with arrangements by Zenón interpreted by his Quartet. Sonero: The Music of Ismael Rivera received a Grammy nomination and a Latin Grammy nomination for Best Latin Jazz Album.
 El Arte Del Bolero (Miel Music, 2021): A duo recording with Venezuelan pianist Luis Perdomo. The album was recorded live at The Jazz Gallery in NYC during the COVID-19 Pandemic and features Boleros and other songs from the Latin American Songbook. El Arte Del Bolero received a Grammy nomination and a Latin Grammy nomination for Best Latin Jazz Album.
 Law Years: The Music Of Ornette Coleman (Miel Music, 2021): Recorded live in May 2019 at the Bird's Eye Jazz Club in Basel, Switzerland, along with saxophonist Ariel Bringuez, bassist Demian Cabaud and drummer Jordi Rossy. It features the music of saxophonist and composer Ornette Coleman.
 Música De Las Américas (Miel Music, 2022): Featuring original music by Zenón, all inspired by the history of the American continent. The album showcases his longstanding quartet of pianist Luis Perdomo, bassist Hans Glawischnig, and drummer Henry Cole, with special contributions from the Puerto Rican plena ensemble Los Pleneros de La Cresta and percussionists Paoli Mejías, Daniel Díaz and Victor Emmanuelli.

Teaching and composing 
Zenón has given hundreds of lectures and master classes and has taught all over the world at institutions which include: The Banff Centre, Berklee College of Music, University of North Texas, Siena Jazz, Conservatorium Van Amsterdam, Musik Akademie Basel, Conservatoire de Paris, University of Manitoba, Manhattan School of Music, MIT, Conservatory of Music of Puerto Rico, Columbia University, Princeton University, Kimmel Center for the Performing Arts, San Francisco Conservatory of Music, Universidad Veracruzana, UMass- Amherst and The Brubeck Institute. He is also a permanent faculty member at New England Conservatory of Music in Boston and Manhattan School of Music in New York City. In addition he served as the 2020-2022 Jazz Artist-in-Residence at the Zuckerman Institute at Columbia University. As a composer he has been commissioned by SFJAZZ, The New York State Council for the Arts, Chamber Music America, The John Simon Guggenheim Foundation, Hyde Park Jazz Festival, The Logan Center for the Arts, Jazz Reach, Peak Performances, PRISM Quartet, Spektral Quartet, Peak Performances, Carnegie Hall, MIT and many of his peers.

Caravana Cultural 
In 2011 Zenón founded Caravana Cultural, an initiative that organizes free-of-charge jazz concerts in rural areas of Puerto Rico. Each concert focuses on the music of a distinguished jazz figure (Charlie Parker, Miles Davis and Duke Ellington, among others) and is preceded by a presentation that touches on the basic elements of jazz and improvisation. The concert also incorporates young musicians from the community, who join the band on the last piece of the concert. Caravana Cultural, which is funded and produced by Zenón, looks to make a "social investment" in the island using jazz as a vehicle to advocate for cultural accessibility.

Awards and honors 
He has been featured in The New York Times, The Wall Street Journal, The Los Angeles Times, The Chicago Tribune, Bloomberg Pursuits, Jazz Times, Jazziz, Boston Globe, Billboard, Jazz Inside, Newsday, and Details. He also topped both the Jazz Artist of the Year and Alto Saxophonist of the Year categories on the 2014 Jazz Times Critics Poll and was selected as the 2015, 2018, 2019 and 2020 Alto Saxophonist of the Year by the Jazz Journalist Association. Zenón is a nine-time Grammy nominee and a six-time Latin Grammy nominee. In 2008 he received a fellowship from the John Simon Guggenheim Foundation (which resulted in his recording Esta Plena) and later that year also received a fellowship from the MacArthur Foundation. In 2022 he received an Honorary Doctorate in The Arts from Universidad del Sagrado Corazón in San Juan, Puerto Rico, the highest honor bestowed by the institution.

Discography

As leader 
 Looking Forward (Fresh Sound, 2002)
 Ceremonial (Marsalis Music, 2004)
 Jíbaro (Marsalis, 2005)
 Awake (Marsalis, 2008) – recorded in 2007
 Esta Plena (Marsalis, 2009)
 Alma Adentro: The Puerto Rican Songbook (Marsalis, 2011)
 Rayuela with Laurent Coq (Sunnyside, 2012) – recorded in 2011
 Oye!!! Live in Puerto Rico with The Rhythm Collective (Miel Music, 2013) – live recorded in 2011
 Identities are Changeable (Miel Music, 2014)
 Típico (Miel Music, 2017)
 Yo Soy La Tradición (Miel Music, 2018)
 Sonero: The Music of Ismael Rivera (Miel Music, 2019)
 El Arte Del Bolero (Miel Music, 2021)
 Law Years: The Music of Ornette Coleman (Miel Music, 2021)
 Música De Las Américas (Miel Music, 2022)

As member 
SFJAZZ Collective
 Live at The SFJAZZ Center 2017 (SFJAZZ, 2018)
 Live at The SFJAZZ Center 2016 (SFJAZZ, 2017)
 Live at The SFJAZZ Center 2015 (SFJAZZ, 2016)
 Live at The SFJAZZ Center 2014 (SFJAZZ, 2015)
 10th anniversary (SFJAZZ, 2014)
 Live at The SFJAZZ Center (SFJAZZ, 2013)
 Wonder – The Songs of Stevie Wonder (SFJAZZ, 2013)
 Live 2011 8th Annual Concert Tour (SFJAZZ, 2011)
 Live 2010 7th Annual Concert Tour (SFJAZZ, 2010)
 Live 2009 6th Annual Concert Tour (SFJAZZ, 2009)
 Live 2008 5th Annual Concert Tour (SFJAZZ, 2008)
 Live 2007 4th Annual Concert Tour (SFJAZZ, 2007)
 Live 2006 3rd Annual Concert Tour (SFJAZZ, 2007)
 SFJAZZ Collective 2 (Nonesuch, 2006)
 Live 2005 2nd Annual Concert Tour (SFJAZZ, 2006)
 SFJAZZ Collective (Nonesuch, 2005)
 Inaugural Season 2004 (SFJAZZ, 2004)

As sideman 

With César Cardoso
 Interchange (Antena 2, 2018)
 Dice of Tenors (self-released, 2020)

With Hans Glawischnig
 Common Ground (Fresh Sound, 2003)
 Panorama (Sunnyside, 2008)

With Charlie Haden
 2003: Land of the Sun (Verve, 2004)
 2004: Not in Our Name (Verve, 2005)

With Guillermo Klein
 Los Guachos 3 (Sunnyside, 2002)
 Filtros (Sunnyside, 2008)
 Bienestan (Sunnyside, 2011)
 Carrera (Sunnyside, 2012)
 Los Guachos V (Sunnyside, 2016)

With Brian Lynch
 24/7 (Nagel Heyer, 2005)
 Spheres of Influence Suite (Ewe, 2006)

With Paoli Mejias
 Mi Tambor (Paoli Mejias, 2004)
 Transcend (not on label, 2006)
 Jazzambia (CD Baby, 2008)
 Abriendo Camino (Bandcamp, 2018)

With Miles Okazaki
 Mirror (self-released, 2006)
 Generations (Sunnyside, 2009)
 Figurations (Sunnyside, 2012)

With Luis Perdomo
 Focus Point (RKM, 2004)
 Links (Criss Cross, 2013)

With David Sánchez
 Melaza (Columbia, 2001)
 Travesía (Columbia, 2002)
 Coral (Sony, 2004)

With others
 Bobby Avey, Authority Melts From Me (Whirlwind, 2014)
 Jeff Ballard, Time's Tales (Okeh, 2014)
 Ray Barreto, Homage to Art Blakey (Sunnyside, 2003)
 Edmar Castañeda, Double Portion (2012)
 Henry Cole, Roots Before Branches (2012)
 Stephan Crump, Tuckahoe (Accurate, 2001)
 Adam Cruz, Milestone (Sunnyside, 2012)
 Alexis Cuadrado, A Lorca Soundscape (Sunnyside, 2013)
 Fernando García, Guasábara Puerto Rico (Zoho, 2018)
 David Gilmore, Numerology – Live at The Jazz Standard (2012)
 Edsel Gomez, Cubist Music (Zoho, 2006)
 Julien Labro, From This Point Forward (Azica, 2014)
 Jason Lindner, Live at The Jazz Gallery (Ansic, 2007)
 The Mingus Big Band,* I Am Three (2005)
 Stu Mindeman, Woven Threads (2018)
 Andy Montañez, Sueño (November 2012)
 PRISM Quartet, Heritage/Evolution Vol. 1 (Innova, 2015)
 Antonio Sánchez, Live in New York at Jazz Standard (CAM Jazz, 2010)
 Anthony Tidd (Quite Sane),  The Child of Troubled Times (Rykodisc, 2002)
 Dan Weiss, Sixteen: Drummers Suite (Pi Recordings, 2016)
 Kenny Werner, Coalition (Half Note, 2014)

As co-producer
With Jonathan Suazo
 Extracts of a Desire
With Raphael Pannier
 Faune (French Paradox, 2020)
With Gabriel Vicéns
 The Way We Are Created (Inner Circle Music, 2021)

References

External links
 Miguel Zenon's artist page
 Yo Soy La Tradición on All Things Considered NPR feature
 Identities are Changeable on All Things Considered NPR feature
 Identities are Changeable on Jazz Night in America NPR feature

 "Miguel Zenon: Jazz Sherpa " by Lawrence Peryer (AllAboutJazz.com), October 10, 2011 - extensive interview

1976 births
Living people
Jazz alto saxophonists
Musicians from San Juan, Puerto Rico
MacArthur Fellows
Puerto Rican saxophonists
21st-century saxophonists
Either/Orchestra members
SFJAZZ Collective members
Sunnyside Records artists
Fresh Sounds Records artists